Limasawa Street is the debut studio album by Filipino indie folk/folk pop band Ben&Ben. It was released on May 12, 2019 by Sony Music Philippines. In 2022, the album was certified quadruple-platinum.

Background
Led by twins Paolo Guico and Miguel Guico, Ben&Ben announced on social media that they will be releasing their debut album in May 2019 after topping streaming platforms and radio charts with singles "Kathang Isip", "Ride Home" and "Maybe the Night".

Limasawa Street is derived from the Butuanon word 'masawa' which means 'light', and is also the name of a street that is special in one of the Ben&Ben members, grounded with a "deeply personal story that offers the comforts of life and home". Paolo shared, "We wanted the album to represent a place of light by singing about hopeful perspectives in troubling situations." In November 2019, during a press interview, Ben&Ben mentioned that the band's team are currently discussing about a possibility of releasing a deluxe version of the album.

Singles

The first single "Mitsa (Salamat)" was released 3 months before the album was launched. 'Mitsa' translates to candle wick.

The second single "Pagtingin" and the third single "Araw-Araw" from the album were released on May 2, 2019.

Track listing

Personnel

Ben&Ben
 Miguel Benjamin Guico - lead vocals, acoustic guitar
 Paol Benjamin Guico - lead vocals, acoustic guitar
 Poch Barretto - lead guitar
 Jam Villanueva - drums
 Agnes Reoma - bass
 Patricia Lasaten - keyboards
 Toni Muñoz - percussion, backing vocals
 Andrew de Pano - percussion, backing vocals
 Keifer Cabugao - violin, backing vocals

Additional personnel
 Ebe Dancel - co-lead vocals ("Baka Sakali")
 Nicolai Maybituin - creative director 
 Jean Paul Verona - producer
 Johnoy Danao - producer
 Rene Serna - sound engineer

Awards and nominations

Certification

See also 
Pagtingin
Araw-Araw

References

External links

2019 debut albums
Ben&Ben albums